The 2022 Geneva Open (sponsored by Gonet) was a men's tennis tournament played on outdoor clay courts. It was the 19th edition of the Geneva Open and part of the ATP Tour 250 series of the 2022 ATP Tour. It took place at the Tennis Club de Genève in Geneva, Switzerland, from May 15 through May 21, 2022.

Champions

Singles

  Casper Ruud def.  João Sousa, 7–6(7–3), 4–6, 7–6(7–1)

Doubles

  Nikola Mektić /  Mate Pavić def.  Pablo Andújar /  Matwé Middelkoop, 2–6, 6–2, [10–3]

Points and prize money

Point distribution

Prize money 

*per team

Singles main draw entrants

Seeds 

 Rankings are as of May 9, 2022.

Other entrants 
The following players received wildcards into the singles main draw:
  Ričardas Berankis
  Daniil Medvedev
  Leandro Riedi

The following players received entry from the qualifying draw:
  Facundo Bagnis 
  Marco Cecchinato
  Johan Nikles 
  Christopher O'Connell

Withdrawals
Before the tournament
  Roberto Bautista Agut → replaced by  Emil Ruusuvuori
  Laslo Đere → replaced by  Thanasi Kokkinakis
  Márton Fucsovics → replaced by  Richard Gasquet
  Mackenzie McDonald → replaced by  Kamil Majchrzak
  Jan-Lennard Struff → replaced by  Pablo Andújar

Doubles main draw entrants

Seeds

 Rankings are as of May 9, 2022.

Other entrants
The following pairs received wildcards into the doubles main draw:
  Jakub Paul /  Leandro Riedi
  Ivan Sabanov /  Matej Sabanov

The following pairs received entry as alternates:
  Pablo Andújar /  Matwé Middelkoop
  Sadio Doumbia /  Fabien Reboul

Withdrawals
Before the tournament
  Sander Arends /  Tallon Griekspoor → replaced by  Sander Arends /  Szymon Walków
  Rohan Bopanna /  Matwé Middelkoop → replaced by  Pablo Andújar /  Matwé Middelkoop
  Alexander Bublik /  Márton Fucsovics → replaced by  Alexander Bublik /  Thanasi Kokkinakis
  Lloyd Glasspool /  Harri Heliövaara → replaced by  Sadio Doumbia /  Fabien Reboul
  Andrey Golubev /  Fabrice Martin → replaced by  Romain Arneodo /  Fabrice Martin  
  Julio Peralta /  Franko Škugor → replaced by  Francisco Cabral /  João Sousa
  Tim Pütz /  Michael Venus → replaced by  Luke Saville /  John-Patrick Smith

References

External links 
 Official website

 
2022 ATP Tour
2022
2022 in Swiss tennis
May 2022 sports events in Switzerland